The cerium(IV) oxide–cerium(III) oxide cycle or CeO2/Ce2O3 cycle is a two-step thermochemical process that employs cerium(IV) oxide and cerium(III) oxide for hydrogen production. The cerium-based cycle allows the separation of H2 and O2 in two steps, making high-temperature gas separation redundant.

Process description
The thermochemical two-step water splitting process (thermochemical cycle) uses redox systems:

Dissociation: 2CeO2 → Ce2O3 + 0.5 O2
Hydrolysis: Ce2O3 + H2O → 2CeO2 + H2

In the second exothermic step cerium(III) oxide reacts at – in a fixed bed reactor with water and produces hydrogen and cerium(IV) oxide.

See also
 Copper–chlorine cycle
 Heliostat
 Hybrid sulfur cycle
 HYDROSOL
 Iron oxide cycle
 Solar thermal energy
 Sulfur–iodine cycle
 Zinc–zinc oxide cycle

References

External links
 Thermochemical hydrogen production from a two-step solar-driven water-splitting cycle based on cerium oxides

Chemical reactions
Hydrogen production
Cerium